Admiral Singh may refer to:

Ajendra Bahadur Singh (fl. 1980s–2020s), Indian Navy vice admiral
Karambir Singh (born 1959), Indian Navy admiral
Kirpal Singh (Indian Navy officer) (1925–2021), Indian Navy rear admiral
Madhvendra Singh (fl. 1950s–1990s), Indian Navy admiral
Ran Vijay Singh (1932–1971), Indian Navy rear admiral
Ravneet Singh (vice admiral) (fl. 1980s–2020s), Indian Navy vice admiral
Sanjay Jasjit Singh (fl. 1980s–2020s), Indian Navy vice admiral